Balcanica is an annual publication of the Institute for Balkan Studies of the Serbian Academy of Sciences and Arts.

Thirty-eight volumes have been published since 1970, with contributions from prominent Serbian, Yugoslav, Balkan and European scholars. Balcanica covers a wide range of topics from prehistory and archaeology, cultural studies, art history, literature and anthropology to modern and contemporary history. In order to reach a broader scholarly audience, since 2006 (nº XXXVI), Balcanica has been published in English and French. The current editor-in-chief is Vojislav G. Pavlović.

External links 

Serbian Academy of Sciences and Arts
European studies journals
Annual journals
Balkan studies
Publications established in 1970
Open access journals
French-language journals
English-language journals